Disco Tanz is the eighth compilation album compiled and remixed by Italian DJ Gigi D'Agostino, release in 2005 through Noise Maker records.

Remixes
The album features remixes of a number of popular songs:

 "Memories" is based on the Kim Wilde song "Cambodia".
 "Like a Prayer" is a cover of the "Madonna single "Like a Prayer".
 "Moonlight Shadow" is a remix of the Mike Oldfield track of the same name.
 "Parole Parole" is a cover of the Dalida and Alain Delon duet "Paroles, paroles".
 "Those Were The Days" is a cover of the Mary Hopkin UK number one single "Those Were The Days", originally by Eugene Raskin.
 "Natural" contains excerpts from Mozarts "Rondo Alla Turca".
 "Espana Cani" is a cover of "España cañí", a famous instrumental Spanish piece of pasodoble music by Pascual Marquina Narro.
 "Cammino Contento" is an adoption of the Russian folk song "Коробейники", widely known as the "Tetris Theme".
 "Fasten Your Seatbelt" features excerpts from the Pendulum track "Fasten Your Seatbelt".

Track listing

CD 1
 Dottor Dag - "Lo Sbaglio "(Groviglio Mix) - 5:49
 Dos - "Memories" - 6:59
 Federico Romanzi - "Luna Park" - 2:36
 Orchestra Maldestra - "Tecno Uonz" - 4:26
 Onironauti - "Tanzeria" - 5:54
 Officina Emotiva - "Contaminando" (Uomo Suono Trip) - 3:44
 Officina Emotiva - "Like A Prayer" (Gigi Dag & Luca Noise Trip) - 5:27
 Dottor Dag - "Non Sono Un Santo" - 4:52
 Luca Noise - "Moonlight Shadow" (Gigi Dag & Luca Noise Trip) - 4:20
 Dance 'N' Roll - "Stay" (Tentando Mix) - 4:02
 Double S vs 2 Daniels - "Parole Parole" (Gigi D'Agostino Tanz) - 5:11
 Il Folklorista - "Those were the days" (Gigi Dag & Luca Noise) - 5:53
 Gigi D'Agostino - "I Wonder Why" (Gigi Dag From Beyond) - 7:00
 Dottor Dag - "Luce" (Raggio Di Sole) - 4:00
 La Tana Del Suono - "Marcia Lenta" - 5:20

CD 2
 Gigi D'Agostino - "I Wonder Why" (Non Giochiamo) - 6:02
 Officina Emotiva - "Natural" (Gigi Dag & Luca Noise a Passeggio) - 6:01
 Uomo Suono - "Monolitico" - 7:42
 Woofer - "Fiesta Don't Stop" - 6:04
 Il Folklorista - "Espana Cani" - 3:34
 Uomo Suono - "Bilaterale" - 4:02
 Orchestra Maldestra - "Carica Tremenda" (Gigi Dag & Luca Noise) - 5:08
 Uomo Suono - "Cammino Contento" - 7:50
 Orchestra Maldestra - "Fasten Your Seatbelt" (Gigi Dag & Luca Noise Trip) - 5:15
 Gigi D'Agostino - "I Wonder Why" (Gigi Dag From Beyond F.M.) - 3:30
 Orchestra Maldestra - "Carica tremenda" (Gigi Dag & Pandolfi) - 5:34
 Gigi D'Agostino - "I Wonder Why" (Gigi Dag From Beyond....To Live) - 5:56
 Luca Noise - "Trip Trance" - 5:43
 Dj Pandolfi - "Movimento Quotidiano "(F.M.) - 3:15
 Dj Pandolfi - "Movimento Quotidiano" - 4:04

References

Gigi D'Agostino albums
2005 compilation albums